The Muzzle Loaders Associations International Committee (MLAIC) is the world governing body for competition with muzzle-loading firearms. Both originals (made prior to 1900) and replica's thereof.

MLAIC organises World Championships on even-numbered years, with European and Long Range Championships run in odd-numbered years. In 2022, Deutscher Schützenbund hosted the 29th World Championship in Pforzheim, Germany.

History
From an early document by our Patron, Paul Marchand 1976.

While M.L. guns were always used in Europe, especially hunting by farmers, there was no shooting club for old gun fans. In the U.S., Red Farris and Oscar Seth held a first shooting match at Portsmouth (Ohio) on 22 February 1931, then founded the N.M.L.R.A. in 1935, and held a yearly championship at Friendship (Indiana) attended by many shooters. Their scope was mainly civil free guns, and folklore, while Europeans were more concerned with military muskets and rifle events.
In Europe, the M.L.A.G.B. founded on 25 October 1952, held a first shoot at Bisley on 1 August 1953, then first British Championship on 9 May 1954. In France, some collectors, grouped around Mr Demaison, began to shoot old rifles at the Tir National de Versailles in 1960, and founded a special division of T.N.V. to shoot old guns. They then founded "Les Arquebusiers de France" in 1962. The first French—British Championship organized at Bisley on 1 and 2 June 1953 by President Burton of M.L.A.G.B. and Mr Demaison—This "Entente Cordiale" cup became a yearly event, and attracted, as well as British and French shooters, some foreign spectators. During this time some postal matches were organized with South Africa and U.S.A. The Entente Cordiale continues till this day.
In 1967, Piero Vergnano founded the "Archibugieri di Piemonte" (Torino) and had a first shoot with A d F, in Lyon, on 7 and 8 October 1967.
In 1969, the manager of the Deutsches Waffen Journal, Richard Horlacher decided to sponsor M.L. shooting, and organized a first match at Schwtibisch Hall, that was a big success, and became a yearly championship. The rules for M.L. Shooting were different in each country and in 1971, Arquebusiers de France invited all countries interested, to an international championship at Vaudoy-en-Brie, based on roughly agreed rules, and to a provisory international committee: "to establish common rules acceptable by all countries involved, so as to permit the use of the international rules for the national matches, with standard guns, and equipment, facilitate postal matches, and to initiate an international committee able to organize championship, and take necessary decisions".

The response was enthusiastic, with British, German, Italian and Spanish shooters attending the match, and even two members of N.M.L.R.A. – U.S.A. – Jim Briggs and Thomas Evans. The committee formed by Landry, Marchand and Cunnington for ‘France, Bill Curtis for Great-Britain, Richard Horlacher for Germany, Piero Vergnano and Sterrantino for Italy, Jorge Sichling for Spain, and Jim Briggs for U.S.A., decided:
1) To found a M.L.A. committee-meeting at each yearly championship.
2) To adopt standard shooting rules.
3) To keep as Aim of the

a) Develop public interest in old arms thru shooting them as near as reasonably possible to original conditions and style.
b) Prevent any alteration spoiling historical value of old weapons, promote intelligent cleaning and repair to save old guns from destruction or damage beyond repair.
c) Develop historical research on old guns and on old shooting methods.
d) Organize postal and yearly matches, establish shooting rules, publish results, give cups and championship titles, settle all litigations about shooting rules, etc.

The first M.L.A.I.C. Championship, due to initiatives of Jorge Sichling, was held on 23 and 24 September 1972 at Madrid, organized by the Real Federacion Española de Tiro Olimpico, under the Presidency of Jose Angel Escorial y San Felice, with British, French, German, Italian and Spanish teams. It was a big success with 31 expert-shooters, and contributed much to the establishment of muzzle-loading shooting in Spain.

The next year, the 2nd Championship organized by the, Muzzle Loaders Association of Great Britain (President E. Burton) at Bisley on 29 and 30 September, saw a greater number of shooters (83), and the miry of Danemark; clay pigeon events were tried, and officially adopted. The third championship was held on 5 and 6 October, at Schlibisch Hall (Germany) organized by the Deutscher Schützenbund (President Alfred Michaelis) under the direction of Hans Kowar, with 100 shooters, and addition of Switzerland and Netherlands, and attracted many spectators. The Fourth championship has been organized by the FIATA (Federazione Italiana Associazoni Tiro ad Avancarica), at Codogno, on 27 and 28 September 1975, with participation of South African and Austrian Teams, with 8 records broken. The fifth championship organised by Arquebusiers de France, Tir National de Versailles and Federation Francaise de Tir will be shot a T.N.V. range on 25 and 26 September, with participation of U.S. and Japanese shooters.

Member nations

The European Zone consists of Austria, Belgium, Bulgaria, Czech Republic, Denmark, Finland, France, Germany, Great Britain, Hungary, Ireland, Italy, Luxembourg Netherlands, Norway, Poland, Portugal, Slovak Republic, Spain, Sweden, and Switzerland, have member status.

The Pacific Zone consists of Argentina, Australia, Canada, Japan, New Zealand, South Africa, and the United States have member status.

Correspondent nations are Brazil, Croatia, Greece, Malta, India and Russia.

Secretary Generals

 1970 – 2002: Capt' Paul Marchand, France
 2002 – 2003: Mr Andrew Courtney, Great Britain
 2003 – 2007: Mr Donald (Bucky) Malson, USA
 2007 – 2008: Mr Kim Atkinson, Australia (Temp)
 2008 – 2016: Mr David Brigden, Great Britain
 2016 – Current: Mr Gerhard Lang, Germany

See also 
 List of shooting sports organizations

References

External links
 Official Website
 Long-Range Muzzle-Loading website

Shooting sports organizations
Muzzleloading